The Feast of the Most Holy Name of the Blessed Virgin Mary is an optional memorial celebrated in the liturgical calendar of the Catholic Church on 12 September. It has been a universal Roman Rite feast since 1684, when Pope Innocent XI included it in the General Roman Calendar to commemorate the victory at the Battle of Vienna in 1683. It was removed from the Church calendar in the liturgical reform following Vatican II but restored by Pope John Paul II in 2002, along with the Feast of the Holy Name of Jesus.

Meaning of the name 
In Hebrew, the name Mary is "Miryam". In Aramaic, the language spoken in her own time, the form of the name was "Mariam". Based on the root "merur", the name signifies "bitterness". This is reflected in the words of Naomi, who, after losing a husband and two sons lamented, " “Do not call me Naomi (‘Sweet’). Call me Mara (‘Bitter’), for the Almighty has made my life very bitter." 

Meanings ascribed to Mary's name by the early Christian writers and perpetuated by the Greek Fathers include: "Bitter Sea," "Myrrh of the Sea", "The Enlightened One," "The Light Giver," and especially "Star of the Sea." Stella Maris was by far the favored interpretation. Jerome suggested the name meant "Lady", based on the Aramaic "mar" meaning "Lord". In the book, The Wondrous Childhood of the Most Holy Mother of God, St. John Eudes offers meditations on seventeen interpretations of the name "Mary," taken from the writings of "the Holy Fathers and by some celebrated Doctors". The name of Mary is venerated because it belongs to the Mother of God.

Veneration
Mary's name occurs in the first part and in the second part of the Hail Mary.

At Rome, one of the twin churches at the Forum of Trajan is dedicated to the Name of Mary (Santissimo Nome di Maria al Foro Traiano).

Promoters of veneration of the Holy Name of Mary include: Saint Anthony of Padua, Saint Bernard of Clairvaux, and Saint Alphonsus Maria de Liguori. A number of religious orders such as the Cistercians, customarily give each member "Mary" as part of his/her name in religion as a sign honor and of entrustment to her.

Feast day
The feast is a counterpart to the Feast of the Holy Name of Jesus (January 3). Its object is to commemorate all the privileges bestowed upon Mary by God and all the graces received through her intercession and mediation.

The entry in the Roman Martyrology about the feast speaks of it in the following terms:
The Holy Name of the Blessed Virgin Mary, a day on which the inexpressible love of the Mother of God for her Holy Child is recalled, and the eyes of the faithful are directed to the figure of the Mother of the Redeemer, for them to invoke with devotion.

History
The feast day began in 1513 as a local celebration in Cuenca, Spain, celebrated on 15 September.  In 1587 Pope Sixtus V moved the celebration to 17 September. Pope Gregory XV extended the celebration to the Archdiocese of Toledo in 1622. In 1666 the Discalced Carmelites received permission to recite the Divine Office of the Name of Mary four times a year. In 1671 the feast was extended to the whole Kingdom of Spain. From there, the feast spread to all of Spain and to the Kingdom of Naples.

In 1683, the Polish king, John Sobieski, arrived at Vienna with his army. Before the Battle of Vienna, Sobieski placed his troops under the protection of the Blessed Virgin Mary. In the following year, to celebrate the victory, Pope Innocent XI added the feast to the General Roman Calendar, assigning to it the Sunday within the octave of the Nativity of Mary.

The reform of Pope Pius X in 1911 restored to prominence the celebration of Sundays in their own right, after they had been often replaced by celebrations of the saints. The celebration of the Holy Name of Mary was therefore moved to 12 September. Later in the same century, the feast was removed from the General Roman Calendar in 1969 in the reform of the Calendar by Pope Paul VI, as something of a duplication of the 8 September feast of the Nativity of the Blessed Virgin Mary, but it did not cease to be a recognized feast of the Roman Rite, being mentioned in the Roman Martyrology on 12 September. In 2002 Pope John Paul II restored the celebration to the General Roman Calendar.

Legacy
William Joseph Chaminade chose the Feast of the Holy Name of Mary as the patronal feast of the Society of Mary (Marianists) rather than a day commemorating a particular dogma or devotion in order to focus on the person of Mary.

A number of parishes and schools are dedicated in honor of the Holy Name of Mary.

The cathedral of Hagåtña, Guam, is called the Dulce Nombre de Maria Cathedral Basilica.

See also
 Ave Maris Stella

References

External links 
 Bernard of Clairvaux, Homily on the Holy Name of Mary
 Liguori, Alphonsus. "The Holy Name of Mary - The Power of Her Name"

Catholic holy days
Marian devotions
Titles of Mary
September observances
Catholic liturgy